The 2020 USL League One season was the second season of USL League One. The regular season was scheduled to begin on March 27 and end on October 3. On March 13, it was announced the regular season start would be delayed to April 11 due to the COVID-19 pandemic. This delay was extended to May 10. The delay was extended for a third time with the USL awaiting guidance and clarity from various authorities before announcing a new date. On June 5, the league announced a provisional return date of July 18. On July 2, the league announced a modified 20-game schedule (but changed to a 16-game schedule on July 17) with a modified playoffs. Now, only the top two teams will go straight to the League Finals, on the weekend of October 31. On July 8, Toronto FC II announced they would not play in 2020 because of COVID-19 restrictions. They remain a member club of the league, and plan to return for the 2021 season. Nine teams return from the inaugural season, while three  new teams enter for the first time; MLS reserve teams Fort Lauderdale CF and New England Revolution II, and expansion club Union Omaha.

North Texas SC was the defending champion. They were unable to defend the title after finishing third in the regular season, eliminating them from the Championship game.

The Championship game was canceled on October 29, 2020, after several Union Omaha players tested positive for COVID-19. Greenville Triumph SC was awarded the title based on points per game average (2.188 to 1.825).

Teams

†Withdrew for the season.

Managerial changes

League table

Results table

USL League One Championship 
The game was canceled the day before because several Union Omaha players tested positive for COVID-19. Greenville was awarded the title based on points per game average (2.188 to 1.825).

Statistical leaders

Top scorers 

Source:

Top assists 

Source:

|}

Clean sheets

Source:

Hat-tricks

League awards

Individual awards 
 Most Valuable Player:  Emiliano Terzaghi (RIC)
 Defender of the Year:  Brandon Fricke (GVL)
 Young Player of the Year:  Chris Brady (MAD)
 Goalkeeper of the Year:  Dallas Jaye (GVL)
 Coach of the Year:  John Harkes (GVL)
 Golden Boot:  Emiliano Terzaghi (RIC)
 Assists Champion:  Ethan Vanacore-Decker (OMA)
 Golden Glove:  Dallas Jaye (GVL)
 Goal of the Year:  Josh Coan (TUC)
 Save of the Year:  Joe Rice (NEW)

All-League Teams

Monthly awards

Weekly awards

See also
 USL League One
 2020 USL Championship season

References

External links
 USL League One official website

 
2020
2020 in American soccer leagues
Association football events curtailed and voided due to the COVID-19 pandemic